Leandro Javier Delgado Plenkovich (born July 15, 1982) was a Chilean footballer of Croatian descent.

Career
Leandro Delgado started his career in Puerto Montt, at those times in the Primera División Chilena, alternating his playing position between defence and the midfield. In 2007 season, Delgado was transferred on loan to Cobreloa, and played Apertura and Clausura tournaments. In 2008, Delgado signed with Everton where he played for two seasons and won the 2008 Torneo Apertura. In 2010, Unión Española have signed the defender from Corporación Deportiva Everton de Viña del Mar to reinforce its squad for the current season.

On January 5, 2012, it was reported that Delgado came to an agreement with Chilean giants Colo-Colo with the "albos" buying the 100% of his pass to Unión Española, and with a contract for three years.

International career 

Delgado made his debut for Chile national football team in a friendly match against Paraguay on December 21, 2011 at the orders of team manager Claudio Borghi.

Personal life
Leandro Delgado Plenković is of Croatian descent. The surname Plenković has his origin in the town of Svirče, near the city of Jelsa, Croatia on the island of Hvar.

Honours

Club
Everton
Primera División de Chile (1): 2008 Apertura

References

Living people
Puerto Montt footballers
Cobreloa footballers
Everton de Viña del Mar footballers
Unión Española footballers
Colo-Colo footballers
1982 births
People from Puerto Montt
Chilean footballers
Association football midfielders
Chilean people of Croatian descent